Lanostane or 4,4,14α-trimethylcholestane is a tetracyclic chemical compound with formula .  It is a polycyclic hydrocarbon, specifically a triterpene. It is an isomer of cucurbitane.

The name is applied to two stereoisomers, distinguished by the prefixes 5α- and 5β-, which differ by the handedness of the bonds at a particular carbon atom (number 5 in the standard steroid numbering scheme).

Replacement of a hydrogen atom attached to carbon number 3 in the 5α isomer with a hydroxyl group results in lanosterol, the biogenetic precursor of the steroids in animals.

References

Lanostanes
Triterpenes